The Gracies and the Birth of Vale Tudo is a documentary film about the legendary Gracie family and the creation and expansion of Ultimate Fighting Championship around the world. It was directed by Victor Cesar Bota, who is also working on Incessant, a mini-series based on the documentary.

Plot
This 90-minute feature documentary tells story of three generations of the Gracie family, who dominated Brazilian jiu-jitsu in the 20th century, and the creation of Mixed Martial Arts events.

Music and film festivals
The music was by Mauro Refosco, Forro in the Dark and Ilhan Ersahin and others from Nublu Records. The Gracies and the Birth of Vale Tudo was screened at the São Paulo International Film Festival and released at Festival do Rio.

Cast
(as themselves)
Renzo Gracie
Robson Gracie
Ryan Gracie
Rolls Gracie
Rickson Gracie
Carlson Gracie
Reylson Gracie
Oleg Taktarov
Carlos Gracie
Carlos Gracie, Jr.
Rilion Gracie
Rorion Gracie
Royce Gracie
Royler Gracie
Rodrigo Gracie
Claudia Zandomenico
Gary Busey
Mel Gibson
Sonja Gracie
Chuck Norris
Rei Zulu

Gracie Jiu-Jitsu students
 Chuck Norris 
 Mel Gibson
 Catherine Zeta Jones
 Brad Pitt
 Nicolas Cage
 Chris Conrad
 Jim Carrey
 Milla Jovovich
 Ed O'Neill
 Steve Irwin
 Steve O
 Michael Clarke Duncan
 Michael Dudikoff
 Olivier Gruner
 Kevin James
 Richard Norton
 CM Punk
 Joe Rogan
 Jason Statham
 Paul Walker
 Mario Van Peebles
 The Undertaker
 Harley Flanagan
 Rakaa Iriscience
 Tommy Lee
 Herman Li
 Maynard James Keenan
 Alex Varkatzas
 Rikki Rockett
 Billy Graziadei
 David Mamet
 John Milius
 Guy Ritchie
 David Callaham

References

External links
 

2009 films
Documentary films about sportspeople
American sports documentary films
American martial arts films
Mixed martial arts documentaries
2000s American films